Ager Aketxe Barrutia (born 30 December 1993) is a Spanish professional footballer who plays as an attacking midfielder for SD Eibar.

He began his career with Athletic Bilbao, going on to represent both the first and the second teams and make 34 official appearances for the former. He also competed professionally in Major League Soccer, with Toronto FC.

Club career

Athletic Bilbao
Born in Bilbao, Biscay, Basque Country, Aketxe joined Athletic Bilbao's Lezama setup in 2003, aged nine. He made his senior debut with the feeder club CD Basconia in 2011, in Tercera División.

In May 2012, Aketxe was promoted to the second team in the Segunda División B. He featured regularly for the side, playing all league games in his second season.

On 2 September 2014, Aketxe was promoted to the main squad in La Liga, being assigned number 23 jersey. He appeared in his first match as a professional on 17 September, coming on as a substitute for Iker Muniain in the 75th minute of a 0–0 home draw against FC Shakhtar Donetsk in the group stage of the UEFA Champions League; however, he sustained a foot injury in that match which put him out of action for six weeks.

Aketxe scored his first goal in the Spanish top flight on 17 May 2015, netting his team's first in a 3–2 away win against Elche CF to help Athletic come from behind 0–2. In the beginning of 2016, he was moved down back to the B side to help them avoid relegation from Segunda División and gain some minutes. On 27 February he scored a hat-trick in a 4–2 home victory over SD Ponferradina, but the team eventually finished in 22nd and last position.

On 31 January 2017, after making no appearances during the first half of the campaign due to recovering from a serious knee injury suffered at the end of the previous season, Aketxe was loaned to Cádiz CF in the second tier until June. On 16 February 2018, Athletic cancelled his contract with immediate effect (retaining the right to re-sign him in the following years) to allow him to negotiate a move abroad.

Toronto FC
Aketxe signed with Major League Soccer side Toronto FC on 23 February 2018, with Athletic holding a buy-back option at the conclusion of his contract. He made his debut four days later, coming on as a second-half substitute in a 0–0 home draw against Colorado Rapids in the second leg of the round of 16 of the CONCACAF Champions League. His first start came on 3 March in the opening match of the 2018 MLS season, a 2–0 home defeat to Columbus Crew SC.

Cádiz
On 11 July 2018, Aketxe returned to Cádiz after agreeing to a six-month loan with an option to purchase. In November, Toronto and player terminated the remaining term on their contract "by mutual consent".

After cutting ties with the Canadian club, Athletic Bilbao did not exercise their buyback option and Aketxe's original loan with Cádiz became an official deal, expiring on 30 June 2019.

Deportivo
On 13 July 2019, free agent Aketxe joined fellow second division side Deportivo de La Coruña on a one-year deal, where he was given the number 10 shirt. He scored a goal on his official debut on 18 August, in a 3–2 home victory over Real Oviedo.

Almería
On 7 September 2020, after being relegated, Aketxe agreed to a two-year contract with UD Almería in the same league. He again scored in his very first appearance, helping to a 2–0 away win against CD Lugo.

Eibar
On 27 July 2021, Aketxe signed a two-year deal with SD Eibar, recently relegated to the second tier.

Personal life
Aketxe's older brother, Isaac, is also a footballer; he too was groomed at Athletic Bilbao's youth setup. Their father, known as Isaac Aqueche due to spelling conventions of the time, played as a midfielder in the lower divisions of Spanish football including a spell with Athletic's reserves.

In May 2016, Aketxe and two others were put on trial for having caused minor injuries to an off-duty ertzaina the previous August during a local festival in his place of residence, the Getxo neighbourhood of Romo.

Career statistics

Honours
Athletic Bilbao
Supercopa de España: 2015

References

External links

1993 births
Living people
Spanish footballers
Footballers from Getxo
Association football midfielders
La Liga players
Segunda División players
Segunda División B players
Tercera División players
CD Basconia footballers
Bilbao Athletic footballers
Athletic Bilbao footballers
Cádiz CF players
Deportivo de La Coruña players
UD Almería players
SD Eibar footballers
Major League Soccer players
Toronto FC players
Spain youth international footballers
Spanish expatriate footballers
Expatriate soccer players in Canada
Spanish expatriate sportspeople in Canada